"Playground" is a single by Another Bad Creation, from the album Coolin' at the Playground Ya Know!  Released on March 25, 1991, the song reached #10 on the Billboard Hot 100 chart, #4 on the R&B chart, and #36 on the Dance chart.

Track listings
US Single 
1 Playground [7" Mix]
2 Playground [Acappella Mix]

US  Vinyl, 12" 
A  Playground [12" Mix] 5:18
B1 Playground [7" Mix] 4:16
B2 Playground [Acappella Mix] 3:53

UK Vinyl, 7" 
A Playground [Radio Remix] 3:50
B Playground [Original 7" Mix] 4:16

UK Vinyl, 12" 
A1 Playground [12" Mix] 5:18
A2 Playground [7" Mix] 4:16
B1 Playground [Dub Mix] 5:38
B2 Playground [Mo' Beats] 4:11

References

1991 singles
Another Bad Creation songs
Songs written by Dallas Austin
Songs written by Michael Bivins